Psychotria rhonhofiae is a species of plant in the family Rubiaceae. It is endemic to Ecuador.  It was named after Arnold (1875-1948) and Hertha Schultze-Rhonhof, botanists active in Ecuador in the 1930s.

References

 S.S. Renner 1993.  A History of Botanical Exploration in Amazonian Ecuador, 1739-1988.   Downloaded on January 1, 2009

rhonhofiae
Endemic flora of Ecuador
Data deficient plants
Taxonomy articles created by Polbot